David Ascalon (born March 8, 1945) is an Israeli contemporary sculptor and stained glass artist, and co-founder of Ascalon Studios.

Biography
Ascalon was born in Tel Aviv, in the British Mandate of Palestine (now Israel) on March 8, 1945. He received his early artistic training as an apprentice of his father, the Hungarian-born sculptor and industrial designer, Maurice Ascalon (1913–2003).

Ascalon came to the United States as a teenager when his father took the family across the Atlantic as a means to broaden their horizons. He attended Beverly Hills High School in Beverly Hills, California and graduated in 1963.
David studied art and design at the California State University at Northridge as well as architecture and interior design at California Polytechnic State University in San Luis Obispo, and Pratt Institute in New York, where he received his degree. Throughout the 1970s, Ascalon worked in the fields of interior design and architecture in New York, and for the firm of the noted Israeli architect Aryeh Elhanani in Tel Aviv. Seeking a more immediate means of artistic expression than the architectural arts would allow, he began experimenting in sculptural metalwork, exploring abstract compositions with a welding torch. He currently resides in the Philadelphia suburb of Cherry Hill, New Jersey, and in the Hamptons on the east end of Long Island, New York.  In recent years, Ascalon has taken an active role on issues of artist rights advocacy, and in 2010 filed a federal suit under the Visual Artists Rights Act (VARA) in a case involving the rights of artist with respect to the restoration of public sculpture.  Among David's other relatives are his son, contemporary industrial designer Brad Ascalon, and older brother Adir Ascalon (d.2003). Adir was a surrealist painter and sculptor who collaborated with the noted Mexican muralist David Alfaro Siqueiros. David is also a licensed airplane private pilot.

Ascalon Studios
In 1977, David relocated to the Philadelphia area where he joined up with his father to form Ascalon Studios. It was then that he began focusing his efforts on the creation of site-specific artwork for worship and public spaces. Much of his work draws on ecclesiastical themes, however utilizing non-traditional approaches and contemporary forms. In the years since its founding, Ascalon Studios, under David's direction, has executed hundreds of projects throughout North America, ranging from monumental sculptures and liturgical stained glass windows, to mosaic murals. Many of his works adorn synagogue architecture and other venues for worship. Among his sculptural installations are a number of Holocaust Memorials that pay tribute to the victims of the atrocities (included are many from his own family).

Awards and Recognitions
David has been the recipient of major international design commissions and awards, including from the American Institute of Architects' Interfaith Forum on Religion, Art and Architecture. He is a member of the International Sculpture Center, and he is past president of the American Guild of Judaic Art and has lectured on the subject of Judaic art.

COVID-19 Response
In response to the COVID-19 pandemic and shortages of Personal Protective Equipment (PPE) for healthcare workers throughout the United States, in April 2020, David retooled the Ascalon Studios facility in order to produce hundred of specialty devices known as COVID-19 Intubation Safety Boxes for donation to American hospitals. The Safety Boxes, first used by healthcare workers in January 2020 when the pandemic hit Taiwan, are specialized acrylic cubes with flap-sealed hand holes that fit over the head and torso of infected patients, designed to allow doctors, nurses, and first responders the ability to undertake ventilator intubation and extubation while minimizing exposure to contaminated secretions emanated during the process.

Gallery

References

"100 Artists of the Mid-Atlantic", by E. Ashley Rooney, Schiffer Books (2011)  .
"The Visual Artists Rights Act at 20", by Daniel Grant, The Huffington Post, February 7, 2011.
"What is the Meaning of This", by Martha Lufkin, The Art Newspaper, October 2010 at 28.
"When Creator and Owner Clash", by Daniel Grant, The Wall Street Journal, August 31, 2010.
"Public Art: A World's Eye View, Integrating Art Into the Environment" ICO Publishers, Japan (2008). .
“Inside, Outside, Sculpture Shows Pieces of His Soul”, by Jan Hefler, The Philadelphia Inquirer, October 31, 2004.
Smithsonian American Art Museum Art Inventories Catalogue, Call Numbers: PA001671, PA001366, NY000754, 74780001, 747800003, 747800004, 74700005
"Out of the Box", by Haley Chouinard, Business of Home, April 8, 2020.

"South Jersey Companies Team Up to Provide Free Intubation Boxes”, by Dave Isaac, Courier Post, April 10, 2020.

External links 
 Ascalon Studios

1945 births
Beverly Hills High School alumni
Jewish Israeli artists
Jewish sculptors
American sculptors
Israeli sculptors
Modern sculptors
American stained glass artists and manufacturers
Pratt Institute alumni
Israeli emigrants to the United States
Israeli people of Hungarian-Jewish descent
Living people
People from Tel Aviv
People from Cherry Hill, New Jersey